The following elections occurred in the year 1863.

 1863 French legislative election
 1863 Liberian general election 
 Prussian House of Representatives (28 October)

North America

United States
 1863 New York state election
 United States Senate election in New York, 1863

See also
 :Category:1863 elections

1863
Elections